Socs or SOCS may refer to:
Senior chief special warfare operator, a Navy Seals rating
Single overhead camshaft, a type of internal combustion engine
 Socs, one of the rival gangs in S.E. Hinton's novel The Outsiders.
Socs subculture in the United States in the 1950s
Suppressor of cytokine signalling, family of genes involved in inhibiting the JAK-STAT signaling pathway
Symposium on Combinatorial Search, international computer science conference
System on a chip, an integrated circuit that includes all components of a computer or other electronic system

See also

SOC (disambiguation)
School of Computer Science (disambiguation)